Isla Granito, is an island in the Gulf of California east of the Baja California Peninsula. The island is uninhabited and is part of the Mexicali Municipality.

Biology

Isla Granito has two species of reptile, Sauromalus hispidus (Spiny Chuckwalla) and Uta stansburiana (Common Side-blotched Lizard).

References

Islands of Mexicali Municipality
Islands of Baja California
Uninhabited islands of Mexico